Mirza Nurul Huda (1 August 1919 – 22 December 1991) was an economist and academic who served as the 3rd Vice President of Bangladesh. He served as the governor of East Pakistan and the finance minister of Bangladesh.

Early life 
Huda was born in Jangalia village, Tangail, British India (now Delduar Upazila, Bangladesh) on 1 August 1919. He studied at the Bindubashini High School in Tangail. He completed his bachelor's and master's from the University of Dhaka and graduated in 1940 and 1941 respectively. In 1949, he completed his Ph.D. in agricultural economics from Cornell University. The same year he joined the economics faculty at the University of Dhaka. In late 1952, the Radio Pakistan, Dhaka had arranged debates with Huda as the moderator.  He went to London for a year as a Nuffield Fellow in 1955.

Career 

From 1962 to 1965, he was the member of the planning commission of Pakistan. He protested against the economic discrimination of East Pakistan. He was the Ministry of Planning and Finance of East Pakistan from 1965 to 1969. On 23 March 1969, he replaced Abdul Monem Khan as the governor of East Pakistan but he had to resign from the position a day after upon the declaration of martial law in Pakistan by Yahya Khan. He went back to his teaching profession and in 1969, he was made the chairman of the economics department of the University of Dhaka.

Huda was appointed a member of the council of advisers of government of Bangladesh on 26 November 1975 and held the charge of the ministries of agriculture, commerce, finance, industries and planning. In 1979, President Ziaur Rahman appointed him the minister of finance of Bangladesh. He was made vice president by Justice Abdus Sattar on  24 November 1981 and served until 23 March 1982.

Works
Huda had about twenty research publications to his credit. He edited the book titled "The Test of Time: My Life and Days" written by Maulvi Tamizuddin Khan.

Personal life and death
Huda was married to Kulsum Huda, a daughter of Speaker of Pakistan's National Assembly Maulvi Tamizuddin Khan.  Kulsum was one of the founders and vice chancellors of Central Women's University. Their daughter Simeen Mahmud (d. 2018) was a demographer at the Bangladesh Institute of Development Studies. Simeen was married to the economist Wahiduddin Mahmud. Their eldest son Mirza Najmul Huda is an economist. Another daughter is Zareen Huda Ahmed.

Huda died on 22 December 1991 in Dhaka, Bangladesh.

References 

1919 births
1991 deaths
People from Tangail District
Cornell University alumni
Vice presidents of Bangladesh
Finance ministers of Bangladesh
University of Dhaka alumni
Academic staff of the University of Dhaka
Governors of East Pakistan
Bangladesh Nationalist Party politicians
Pakistani expatriates in the United States
20th-century Bengalis